Kemco (abbreviated from Kotobuki Engineering & Manufacturing Co., Ltd.) is a Japanese video game developer and publisher established in 1984. It is headquartered in Kure, Hiroshima.

One of its best known franchises is the Top Gear series, developed by Sheffield-based English developers Gremlin Graphics.

History

1980s
Kemco was founded in 1984 as Kotobuki System Co., Ltd. to be the video game subsidiary of the multifaceted corporation Kotobuki Engineering & Manufacturing Co., Ltd. (itself established in 1979). The Kemco name represents the initial letters of Kotobuki Engineering Manufacturing Co.

Kemco started by developing video games for the Nintendo Entertainment System. Although technically called Kotobuki System until 2004, the company was already using the brand Kemco on its first game Dough Boy in 1985.

In the late 1980s until the early 1990s, Kemco's video games were distributed in North America by Seika Corporation of Torrance, California, under the joint label of Kemco * Seika.

1990s
In the 1990s, Kemco developed, ported and published video games for an array of platforms including the NES, Super NES, Nintendo 64 and Game Boy. During this decade, the company had its first North American subsidiary, Kemco America, which operated from October 2, 1991, to January 24, 2000.

2000s
In 2001, Kemco USA was founded as a wholly owned subsidiary of Kemco of Japan, especially targeting the American market.

In 2004, Kotobuki's system development division split to become the company Kotobuki Solution Co., Ltd., keeping the Kemco video game brand in the spinoff.

2010s

In the 2010s and 2020s, Kemco is primarily known for its mobile games. Kemco USA closed in 2007, but products continue to be released in North America through Kemco of Japan.

See also
List of Kemco games

References

External links

Video game companies established in 1984
Japanese companies established in 1984
Video game companies of Japan
Video game development companies
Video game publishers